Martha Collison (born 23 September 1996) is a British baker and food columnist. She rose to fame after competing as The Great British Bake Offs youngest ever contestant, reaching the quarter-final of the fifth series at age 17. She writes a weekly column for the Waitrose weekend newspaper, and has released two cookery books as well as running a successful baking blog.

Early life
Martha Collison grew up in Ascot, Berkshire. She has one younger sister, Hannah. She began baking at the age of eight, the result of her parents letting her loose in the kitchen.

Career

Television

In 2014, at the age of 17, Collison took part in the fifth series of The Great British Bake Off on BBC One. She is the youngest ever contestant in the show's history, making it to the quarter finals before being knocked out of the competition.

Martha has since appeared on Bake Off: An Extra Slice, as a guest on Blue Peter and has presented for Saturday Kitchen.

Writing

Collison has released two cookery books. The first, Twist, was released on 14 July 2016, and took simple, everyday recipes, such as chocolate cake and adapted them into new ones, like Chocolate and Passionfruit Layer Cake, or Mint Chocolate Ice Cream Cake. The second book, Crave, was published on 13 July 2017, and split the recipes into chapters for various cravings, Chocolate, Caramel, Cheese, Citrus, Fruit, Nut, Spice and Alcohol.

She writes a monthly column for the Waitrose weekend newspaper and runs a successful baking blog called "Baking Martha".

Radio

Collison currently holds the position of Show Chef on The Graham Norton Radio Show at Virgin Radio UK.

Personal life
Martha lives with her husband in Brighton, Sussex. They married in 2019, where several of the bakers from Collison's series of The Great British Bake Off were in attendance and baked cakes for a cake table.

She is a Christian and has appeared at various faith-based festivals such as Newday, Big Church Day Out South & North and WestPoint. She is also a charity ambassador for the charity Tearfund, and has spent time in Cambodia teaching young girls to bake funnel cakes. She has also been to refugee camps in Lebanon with the charity to see Tearfund's work with those displaced due to conflict.

References 

British bakers
British columnists
Living people
1996 births
The Great British Bake Off contestants
People from Ascot, Berkshire
British Christians